Chiktong T'an'gwang station (Chiktong Colliery station) is a railway station in Chik-tong, Sunch'ŏn city, South P'yŏngan province, North Korea. It is the terminus of the Chiktong Colliery Line of the Korean State Railway.

References

Railway stations in North Korea